Julie Meyer Solvang (born 3 September 1989) is a Norwegian former professional racing cyclist, who rode professionally for  between 2018 and 2020.

References

External links

1989 births
Living people
Norwegian female cyclists
Place of birth missing (living people)